Cooper's Ferry is an archaeological site along the lower Salmon River near the confluence with Rock Creek in the western part of the state of Idaho, United States of America  and part of the Lower Salmon River Archeological District. It is 17 kilometers south of the town of Cottonwood and 63 kilometers upstream from the Snake river. Various lithic and animal remains from the Pleistocene to early Holocene ages have been found there. The site is on traditional Nez Perce land, and known to the tribe as the historical village of Nipéhe.

Excavations

Initial excavation at the site occurred in 1961, 1962 and later in 1964 and was conducted by B. Robert Butler. Stemmed points were recovered in a stratified context. No chronometric dating occurred. In 1997 Loren G. Davis conducted a text excavation finding four stemmed points, in the same horizontal position, and 9 other lithic tools (one large uniface, three blades, two cores, two modified flakes, and a hammerstone). The points were typical of those found in the Columbia Plateau and radiocarbon dated to 11,370 ± 40 years Before Present (about 13,200 calendar years ago). A bone containing a butchering cut mark was also found. Radiocarbon dating of the full excavation produced dates which ranged from Pleistocene to early Holocene ages as the excavation deepened.

The most recent work at the Coopers Ferry site was a joint effort of Oregon State University and the Bureau of Land Management and led by Loren G. Davis. Excavation began 2009 and ran until 2018. A hearth, pits, and animal bones including extinct horses were found. A number of spear points from the western stemmed point tradition were found in a clearly defined pit. These points have been found in various locations including British Columbia and Texas. Similar points were found in Japan from this period though the similarity has been challenged. Between 2012 and 2017, thirteen complete and incomplete projectile points were found. They ranged from 0.5 inches to 2.0 inches in length. The points had two ends, one sharpened and one stemmed, and were found in pits. Radiocarbon dating provided a date mapping to 15,700 years calendar years ago. This would be several thousand years before the Clovis fluted points. It has been noted that the dearth of dendrochronological data for America in that period limits radiocarbon calibration. Several researchers have suggested a later date for the finds. The excavators have suggested their finds support the idea that early Americans arrived via a coastal route followed by riverine travel. An analysis of the data in 2022 supported the earlier dating though the issue is far from closed.

See also
Folsom point
Archaeology of the Americas
Gault site
East Wenatchee Clovis Site

References

Further reading
Clark, Jorie, et al., "The age of the opening of the Ice-Free Corridor and implications for the peopling of the Americas.", Proceedings of the National Academy of Sciences 119.14, 2022
Davis, Loren G., et al., "CONTEXT, PROVENANCE AND TECHNOLOGY OF A WESTERN STEMMED TRADITION ARTIFACT CACHE FROM THE COOPER’S FERRY SITE, IDAHO", American Antiquity, vol. 79, no. 4, pp. 596–615, 2014
Davis, Loren G., and Charles E. Schweger, "Geoarchaeological Context of Late Pleistocene and Early Holocene Occupation at the Cooper's Ferry Site, Western Idaho, USA", Geoarchaeology 19, pp. 685-704, 2004
Gregory, Alex R., "Comparing Random and Nonrandom Spatial Patterns of Artifacts within Lithostratigraphic Unit 3 at Cooper’s Ferry, Idaho.", 2021
Ponkratova, Irina Y., et al., "Technological Similarities Between~ 13 ka Stemmed Points from Ushki V, Kamchatka, Russian Far East, and the Earliest Stemmed Points in North America.", Maritime Prehistory of Northeast Asia. Springer, Singapore, pp. 233-261, 2022
Skinner, Sarah M., "A Geometric Morphometric Analysis of Projectile Point Maintenance using Experimental Resharpening Techniques: An Examination of PFP1 Curation, Cooper’s Ferry Site, Idaho.", 2018
Smith, Geoffrey M., et al., "The Western stemmed tradition: problems and prospects in Paleoindian archaeology in the Intermountain West.", PaleoAmerica 6.1, pp. 23-42, 2020

External links
 Archaeologists uncover oldest known projectile points in the Americas- Phys.org -  December 23, 2022

Archaeology of the United States